From Beginning to End is a 2009 Brazilian romantic drama film directed by Aluizio Abranches, starring Fábio Assunção, Júlia Lemmertz, Gabriel Kaufmann, Lucas Cotrim, João Gabriel Vasconcellos and Rafael Cardoso. It premiered in Brazil on November 27, 2009. The film deals with homosexuality and incest, two types of relationships that are often considered to be taboo. Abranches claims that his only intention was to tell a love story.

The release of the film in Brazil, with only nine copies, was seen by almost 100,000 spectators, leading the film to be on the list of the top 10 most watched Brazilian films of 2009. It was shown in more than 30 national and international festivals, and it was also commercialized in more than 30 countries. In 2010 it was released in DVD in Brazil with success. In France, after a very successful premiere in the cinemas, the first edition of the DVD and Blu-ray was sold out in less than two weeks, and it became a best seller internationally through websites such as Fnac and Amazon.

Plot

 1986 — Thomás is born with his eyes closed, and he does not open them for several weeks following the birth. Julieta, his mother, is unconcerned, believing that when Thomás is ready and wants to open his eyes, he will. These events instill a strong belief in free will in young Thomás. Two weeks after his birth, Thomás opens his eyes, apparently to look directly at his five-year-old half-brother Francisco.
 1992 — Julieta is a wife and a loving mother, working in a hospital emergency department. Her free-spirited youngest son, Thomás, is the product of her marriage to her second husband Alexandre. Pedro, her first husband and father of her eldest son Francisco, lives in Argentina. Pedro and Julieta remain good friends. During childhood, Francisco and Thomás are very close, perhaps too close according to Pedro, with whom they spend a Christmas holiday in Buenos Aires. Julieta is aware of their close relationship and tries to remain understanding. Not long later, Pedro dies.
 2008 — Years later, when Francisco is 27 and Thomás 22, Julieta dies. The brothers become lovers and a love story ensues. Thomás is invited to live and train in Russia for a few years in preparation for the Olympics. Though it is the first time they will be apart, Thomás leaves. Francisco struggles without Thomás. He meets a woman in a club and though he tries to pursue a relationship with her, they both realize he is dedicated to someone else. Unable to be apart any longer, Francisco travels to Russia and the brothers happily reunite.

Cast 
 Rafael Cardoso as Thomás
 Gabriel Kaufmann as Thomás at age six
 João Gabriel Vasconcellos as Francisco
 Lucas Cotrim as Francisco at age 11
 Júlia Lemmertz as Julieta
 Fábio Assunção as Alexandre
 Jean Pierre Noher as Pedro
 Louise Cardoso as Rosa
 Mausi Martínez

Production

Filming 

The film was filmed almost entirely in Rio de Janeiro, Brazil, with parts filmed in Buenos Aires, Argentina.

Music 
The soundtrack was released in December 2009 and includes music by Brazilian artists such as Maria Bethânia, Angela Ro Ro, Simone and Zizi Possi.

Release 

The film attracted more than 10,000 viewers during its weekend debut. Playing in only nine theatres, the film finished sixth place during its opening weekend.

The film was shown on May 26, 2010, at the Seattle International Film Festival, on June 26 at the Frameline Film Festival, on July 9 at the Outfest Film Festival, and on July 15 at the QFest.

Marketing 
The director put the film's trailer on YouTube, generating more than 400,000 views and comments which ranged from outrage to enthusiasm.

Reception

Box office performance 
From Beginning to End grossed $62,081 in nine theatres its opening weekend, $365,094 in second weekend, the film finished sixth place during its opening weekend. The film went on to gross $386,049 in Brazil and $14,373 in Taiwan, for a foreign total of $400,422.

Critical reception 
The film received mixed reviews, some praising it for retaining a good plot while transcending boundaries and others condemning it as an ordinary plot using the subject matter to gain attention.

References

External links 
  
 

2009 films
2009 independent films
2009 LGBT-related films
2009 multilingual films
2009 romantic drama films
2000s coming-of-age drama films
2000s English-language films
2000s Portuguese-language films
2000s Spanish-language films
Brazilian coming-of-age drama films
Brazilian independent films
Brazilian LGBT-related films
Brazilian multilingual films
Brazilian romantic drama films
Coming-of-age romance films
English-language Brazilian films
Films about brothers
Films directed by Aluizio Abranches
Films set in 1986
Films set in 1992
Films set in 2008
Films set in Argentina
Films set in Rio de Janeiro (city)
Films shot in Buenos Aires
Films shot in Rio de Janeiro (city)
Gay-related films
Incest in film
LGBT-related coming-of-age films
LGBT-related romantic drama films